The Man Who Kept His Heart in a Bucket is a 1991 children's picture book by Sonia Levitin and illustrator Jerry Pinkney. Released in 1991 by Dial Press, it is about a young man, Jack, who due to bitter experience keeps his heart in a bucket but then loses it.

Reception
Booklist, in a review of The Man Who Kept His Heart in a Bucket, wrote "The bold watercolors that sweep across the pages of this picture book demand a strong story line. Levitin delivers a respectable one," and the School Library Journal wrote "Levitin's cleverly created story, structured like a traditional folktale, is enhanced by Pinkney's watercolor and pencil scenes of ruddy-cheeked Eastern European peasants, thatched roof cottages, and lush green countryside." Publishers Weekly called it a "thoroughly captivating story firmly rooted in the folktale tradition." 

The Man Who Kept His Heart in a Bucket has also been reviewed by The Horn Book Magazine.

References

1991 children's books
American picture books
Dial Press books
Picture books by Jerry Pinkney
Works by Sonia Levitin